Giuseppe Pamphilj (also Giuseppe Panfili or Giuseppe Panphili ) (1525 – 20 November 1581) was a Roman Catholic prelate who served as Bishop of Segni (1570–1581).

Biography
Giuseppe Pamphilj was born in Verona, Italy in 1525. On 10 February 1570, he was appointed during the papacy of Pope Pius V as Bishop of Segni. On 17 February 1570, he was consecrated bishop by Antonio Elio, Titular Patriarch of Jerusalem, with Orazio Greco, Bishop of Lesina, and Matteo Barbabianca, Bishop of Pula, serving as co-consecrators. He served as Bishop of Segni until his death on 20 November 1581.

Episcopal succession
While bishop, he was the principal consecrator of:
Malachy O'Moloney, Bishop of Killaloe (1571);

and the principal co-consecrator of:
Donat O'Gallagher, Bishop of Killala (1570); 
Girolamo Rusticucci, Bishop of Senigallia (1570); 
Gregorio Forbicini, Bishop of Strongoli (1572); 
Ottavio Mirto Frangipani, Bishop of Caiazzo (1572); 
Gaspare Cenci, Bishop of Melfi e Rapolla (1574); and 
Dermot O'Cleary, Bishop of Mayo (1574).

References 

16th-century Italian Roman Catholic bishops
Bishops appointed by Pope Pius V
1525 births
1581 deaths